Infowar can refer to the following:

 Cyberwarfare
 Info Wars (film), a 2004 online activist documentary
 Infowar Productions, Greek media company founded by Aris Chatzistefanou
 InfoWars, conspiracy website founded by Alex Jones
 Information warfare, the use and management of information technology in pursuit of a competitive advantage over an opponent 
 Psychological warfare